The 2005 Wales Rally GB (formally known as 61st Wales Rally GB) was the 12th round of the 2005 World Rally Championship. The race was held over four days between 15 and 18 September 2005, and operated out of Cardiff, Wales, United Kingdom.

Report 
This rally saw the death of Markko Märtin's co-driver Michael Park of Peugeot after Märtin's 307 lost control and traction, causing it to go off-road and crash into a tree at Stage 15 of the rally. Peugeot decided to withdraw Marcus Grönholm from the event due to the accident.

Race organizers cancelled the rally's final two stages, when Sébastien Loeb, who was in the lead, decided to take a time penalty that gave Petter Solberg the victory in the race. Loeb’s victory would have earned him the 2005 world championship, but he decided he did not want to win the title in such tragic circumstances. As a result, Loeb deliberately opted to check in to the final time control late to incur a two-minute penalty which dropped him to third overall.

Competitors returned to Cardiff to a subdued victory ceremony, where the traditional champagne-spraying ceremony was cancelled and a minute's silence was held.

Statistics

Entry list

References

External links
 Results at ewrc-results.com

Wales
Rally GB
Wales Rally
September 2005 sports events in the United Kingdom